Andinoacara biseriatus,  is a species of fish in the family Cichlidae in the order Perciformes, native to the  Atrato, Baudo, and San Juan River basins in Colombia.

Description

Males can reach a length of  total in length.

Spawning
The fish lays up to 120 eggs on flat stones; afterwards both parents care for the eggs and the larvae.

References

Bibliography 
 Kullander, S.O., 2003. Cichlidae (Cichlids). p. 605-654. In R.E. Reis, S.O. Kullander and C.J. Ferraris, Jr. (eds.) Checklist of the Freshwater Fishes of South and Central America. Porto Alegre: EDIPUCRS, Brasil.

biseriatus
Taxa named by Charles Tate Regan
Fish described in 1913